Chris Maurer (Born August 3, 1984) was the bassist for the third-wave ska band Suburban Legends. After years of watching his older brother sing for the band, he joined the band August 3 of 2000, replacing Justin Meacham who left the band.

He left the band in late 2004 to marry Rachel Lents and continue with his education and was replaced by Suburban Legends bassist Mike Hachey. However, Chris returned for a final performance with the band on November 29, 2005 at Huntington Beach High School for a benefit show for the Ryan Dallas Cook Memorial Fund.

He is the brother of former vocalist of Suburban Legends, Tim Maurer.

References

Living people
Suburban Legends members
American rock bass guitarists
1984 births
American male bass guitarists
21st-century American bass guitarists
21st-century American male musicians